A military transport aircraft, military cargo aircraft or airlifter is a military-owned transport aircraft used to support military operations by airlifting troops and military equipment. Transport aircraft are crucial to maintaining supply lines to forward bases that are difficult to reach by ground or waterborne access, and can be used for both strategic and tactical missions. They are also often used for civilian emergency relief missions by transporting humanitarian aid.

Air frames

Fixed-wing

Fixed-wing transport aeroplanes are defined in terms of their range capability as strategic airlift or tactical airlift to reflect the needs of the land forces which they most often support.

The military glider is an unpowered tactical air transport which has been used in some campaigns to transport troops and/or equipment to the battle front.

Rotary wing
Military transport helicopters are used in places where the use of conventional aircraft is impossible. For example, the military transport helicopter is the primary transport asset of US Marines deploying from LHDs and LHA. The landing possibilities of helicopters are almost unlimited, and where landing is impossible, for example densely packed jungle, the ability of the helicopter to hover allows troops to deploy by abseiling and roping.

Transport helicopters are operated in assault, medium and heavy classes. Air assault helicopters are usually the smallest of the transport types, and designed to move an infantry squad or section and their equipment. Helicopters in the assault role are generally armed for self-protection both in transit and for suppression of the landing zone. This armament may be in the form of door gunners, or the modification of the helicopter with stub wings and pylons to carry missiles and rocket pods. For example, the Sikorsky S-70, fitted with the ESSM (External Stores Support System), and the Hip E variant of the Mil Mi-8 can carry as much disposable armament as some dedicated attack helicopters.

Medium transport helicopters are generally capable of moving up to a platoon of infantry, or transporting towed artillery or light vehicles either internally or as underslung roles. Unlike the assault helicopter they are usually not expected to land directly in a contested landing zone, but are used to reinforce and resupply landing zones taken by the initial assault wave. Examples include the unarmed versions of the Mil Mi-8, Super Puma, CH-46 Sea Knight, and NH90.

Heavy lift helicopters are the largest and most capable of the transport types, currently limited in service to the CH-53 Sea Stallion and related CH-53E Super Stallion, CH-47 Chinook, Mil Mi-26, and Aérospatiale Super Frelon. Capable of lifting up to 80 troops and moving small Armoured fighting vehicles (usually as slung loads but also internally), these helicopters operate in the tactical transport role in much the same way as small fixed wing turboprop air-lifters. The lower speed, range and increased fuel consumption of helicopters are more than compensated by their ability to operate virtually anywhere.

Payload comparison

See also
 Airlift
 Cargo aircraft
 Liaison aircraft
 List of military transport aircraft
 Loadmaster
 Troop ship

References

Further reading